The Samarra Barrage  is a multi-purpose barrage on the Tigris River adjacent (west) of Samarra and north of Baghdad, Iraq. The main purpose of the dam is to divert floodwater in the Tigris River to Lake Tharthar through the Tharthar depression along with irrigation and an 84 MW hydro-electricity station. It also serves to produce hydroelectric power and flood control – although the later has become less critical with the construction of the Mosul Dam upstream and several other large dams in Turkey.

It was completed in 1956 by the German company Züblin. Designs were completed by the British firm Voganlei and Coode. The power station was commissioned in 1972. The Samarra Barrage portion of the structure has 17 gates capable of passing  of water to the Tigris while the Tharthar regulator can divert up to  into a canal with 36 gates. The reservoir's design capacity is  but much of that is filled with sediment.

The intent was to use water stored from the Samarra Barrage and the Ramadi Barrage for irrigation. However, evaporation on Lakes Habbaniyah and Tharthar lead to reduces storage and high salinity; conditions unsuitable for irrigation.

References

External links

Dams in Iraq
Hydroelectric power stations in Iraq
Samarra
Dams completed in 1956
Dams on the Tigris River
1956 establishments in Iraq
Energy infrastructure completed in 1972
Barrages (dam)
Run-of-the-river power stations